The Men's Pole Vault event at the 2007 World Championships in Athletics took place on August 30, 2007 (qualification) and 1 September 2007 (final) at the Nagai Stadium in Osaka, Japan.

Medallists

Records

Results

Qualification

Qualification: Qualifying Performance 5.75 (Q) or at least 12 best performers (q) advance to the final.

Final

References
Official results, qualification - IAAF.org
Official results, final - IAAF.org

Pole vault
Pole vault at the World Athletics Championships